Daniel Calvo may refer to:

 Daniel Calvo (judge),  Santiago Court of Appeals judge of the Republic of Chile
 Daniel Calvo Panizo, Spanish football striker 
 Daniel Calvo Gómez, Bolivian politician
 Daniel Calvo (volleyball) (born 1980), Bolivian volleyball player